Crum is a surname. Notable people with the surname include:

Alexander Crum (1828–1893), Scottish printer and politician
Alison Crum (born 1949), English viol player
Bartley Crum (1900–1959), American lawyer
Brian Justin Crum (born 1988), American singer
Denny Crum (born 1937), former American men's college basketball coach at the University of Louisville
Dick Crum (1928–2005), American folk dancer and teacher
Dick Crum (American football) (born 1934), former American football player and coach
Dustin Crum (born 1999), American football player
Eugene Crum (1953–2013), American sheriff
George Crum (born George Speck; ca. 1828–1914), credited by many to be the inventor of potato chips
Humphrey Ewing Crum-Ewing (born Crum) (1802–1887), Scottish politician
Johnny Crum (1912–1969), Scottish footballer
John Macleod Campbell Crum (1872–1958), Anglican theologian and poet, author of Now the Green Blade Rises
Margaret Crum (1921–1986), British writer
Maurice Crum (disambiguation), multiple people
Walter Crum (1796–1867), Scottish chemist
Walter Ewing Crum (1865–1944), Scottish Coptologist